Bay Lake may refer to:

 Bay Lake (Florida), a lake in Florida on the Walt Disney World Property
 Bay Lake, Florida, an incorporated community named after the lake
 Bay Lake (Minnesota), a lake in Minnesota's Brainerd Lakes region
 Bay Lake Township, Minnesota, a community surrounding Bay Lake
 Laguna de Bay, Philippines